An election to Waterford County Council took place on 10 June 1999 as part of that year's Irish local elections. 23 councillors were elected from five local electoral areas  for a five-year term of office on the system of proportional representation by means of the single transferable vote (PR-STV).

Results by party

Results by Electoral Area

Dungarvan

Kilmacthomas

Lismore

Suir

Tramore

External links

1999 Irish local elections
1999